Charltoniada is a genus of moths of the family Crambidae.

Species
Charltoniada acrocapna (Turner, 1911)
Charltoniada apicella (Hampson, 1896)

Former species
Charltoniada interstriatellus (Hampson, 1896)

References

Crambinae
Crambidae genera
Taxa named by Embrik Strand